South Valley Junior High School may refer to:

 South Valley Junior High School (Gilbert, Arizona). See Gilbert Public Schools.
 South Valley Junior High School (Liberty, Missouri). See Liberty Public School District.